The 6th Legislative Assembly of Saskatchewan was elected in the Saskatchewan general election held in June 1925. The assembly sat from December 3, 1925, to May 11, 1929. The Liberal Party led by Charles Avery Dunning formed the government. After Dunning entered federal politics in 1926, James Garfield Gardiner became Liberal party leader and Premier. Charles Tran, the leader of the Progressive Party, and James Thomas Milton Anderson, the leader of the Conservative Party, shared the role of opposition leader in the assembly.

Walter George Robinson served as speaker for the assembly.

Members of the Assembly 
The following members were elected to the assembly in 1925:

Notes:

Party Standings 

Notes:

By-elections 
By-elections were held to replace members for various reasons:

Notes:

References 

Terms of the Saskatchewan Legislature